The Scarborough subway may refer to:

 Line 3 Scarborough, the light rapid transit line in Toronto, Canada, which has been in service since 1985
 An extension of Line 2 Bloor–Danforth, a subway line in Toronto Canada, expected to open in 2030